The Social Democratic Party (SDP) is a minor political party in the United Kingdom established in 1990. Ideologically, the SDP combines social conservatism with centre-left economic policy and support for a social market economy alongside Euroscepticism. Founded by Jack Holmes, it has been led by William Clouston since 2018.

The current party traces its origin to the Social Democratic Party which was formed in 1981 by a group of dissident Labour Party Members of Parliament (MPs) and former Cabinet members Roy Jenkins, David Owen, Bill Rodgers and Shirley Williams, who became known as the Gang of Four. The original SDP merged with the Liberal Party in 1988 to form the Liberal Democrats, but Owen, two other MPs and a minority of party activists formed a breakaway group also called the Social Democratic Party (1988–1990) immediately afterwards. That continuing party dissolved itself in 1990 after finishing behind the Official Monster Raving Loony Party in a by-election, but activists met and voted to continue the party in defiance of its National Executive, leading to the creation of the current Social Democratic Party under the leadership of the candidate who lost the by-election.

In November 2018 the SDP gained its first and only European parliamentarian when Patrick O'Flynn, Member of the European Parliament (MEP) for East of England, defected from the UK Independence Party. He served in the European Parliament until 1 July 2019. Prominent members include journalists Rod Liddle and Giles Fraser.

At the 2022 local elections, the SDP gained a seat on Leeds City Council from Labour and later that year a Conservative Derbyshire Dales District Councillor defected to the party, giving it a total of two council seats.

In October 2022, the SDP announced a general election pact with the right-wing populist and Eurosceptic party, Reform UK.

History

Formation
The second incarnation of the Social Democratic Party, often referred to as "the continuing SDP", decided to dissolve itself after a disastrous result in the May 1990 Bootle by-election. However, a number of SDP activists met and voted to continue the party in defiance of the National Executive. The continuing group was led by Jack Holmes, who by polling fewer votes than the Official Monster Raving Loony Party at the Bootle by-election had caused the party's end. The much-reduced SDP decided to fight the 1991 Neath by-election. With Holmes serving as the party's election agent, the SDP candidate received 5.3% of the vote—only 174 votes behind the fourth-placed Liberal Democrats, although the SDP candidate joined the Lib Dems shortly after. The party subsequently won just 3 seats on the Neath Port Talbot County Borough Council within the next 8 years after.

Early years (1992–2008) 
In 1992, the SDP had concentrated on campaigning at local level, holding a few council seats in Yorkshire and South Wales. Bridlington Central and Old Town ward on East Riding of Yorkshire Council remained a hotspot of SDP activity, with Ray Allerston holding a council seat there from 1987. From 2003 to 2007, he was joined by his wife Christine Allerston. Meanwhile, Tony Pelton and Brian Smith were elected in 1999 in Tunstall Ward in Richmondshire. A third hotspot consisted of SDP councillors Jeff Dinham, John Sullivan and Anthony Taylor in Aberavon Ward, Neath Port Talbot.

In the 2003 elections, Tony Pelton was re-elected, but Brian Smith was not. In 2005, Christine Allerston became Mayor of Bridlington for a year; however, she stood down before the 2007 local elections in which her husband Ray Allerston was re-elected and made Mayor and David Metcalf picked up the vacant seat. All three Aberavon councillors remained in place, with Anthony Taylor becoming local mayor. However, Tony Pelton in Tunstall stood down before the 2007 locals, ending SDP representation there. Jackie Foster was elected to Bridlington town council in 2008.

Subsequent years (2009–2017) 
In 2012, Councillors Dinham and Sullivan lost their seats in Aberavon, leaving only Anthony Taylor in position. David Metcalf stepped down in early 2014, owing to ill-health. He died soon afterward. This left just Allerston, Foster and Taylor in post. Ray Allerston died on 16 September 2014. A by-election was held in his ward on 27 November which was won by the UK Independence Party (UKIP).

The SDP fielded two candidates in the 2015 general election. Jackie Foster remained an SDP councillor on Bridlington Town Council after the 2015 local elections, but as of 2016 was listed as a Labour councillor. Until May 2017, Anthony Taylor sat on Neath Port Talbot County Borough Council as an independent democrat, but remained listed on the party website as an SDP councillor.

Solihull's Green Party councillor Mike Sheriden defected to the SDP in August 2015. However, when he stood for re-election as an SDP candidate in May 2016, he lost, receiving only 17 votes.

Six SDP candidates stood in the 2017 general election: one in Glasgow East and five in Sheffield constituencies. The SDP candidates received a total of 469 votes and came last in every constituency. According to accounts filed with the Electoral Commission, in 2017 the party—before its present financial growth—had a total income of £2,095.

Growth, new leadership and new declaration (2018–present) 
In January 2018, Kevin Hickson, former leader of Crewe Town Council, joined the SDP. In an article published in the Crewe Chronicle, Hickson, who represented Crewe East on the town council, stated that he left Labour because of growing unease with that party's "almost daily changes" on Brexit policy. He went on to say that the SDP "combines centre left policies on the economy and the welfare state with a firm commitment to implement the will of the people on Brexit, reclaiming sovereignty over money, laws, borders and trade". Hickson is a senior lecturer in Politics at the University of Liverpool and a former Labour parliamentary candidate. He became the party chairman, until being replaced by Paula Watson in January 2020.

William Clouston became leader of the SDP in 2018, and was re-elected by 89% of ballots returned by members in March 2020. He was a member of the original party in the 1980s and remained with the "continuing" SDP after the merger with the Liberal Party. He was a Conservative councillor on Tynedale District Council from 1999 to 2003 and is chairman of Corbridge Parish Council.

In October 2018, the party published a New Declaration of aims and values, whose name recalls the original Limehouse Declaration of 1981 and which the party describes as putting the principles of social democracy in a modern setting. The declaration calls for a "communitarian, social democratic nation-state".

Patrick O'Flynn, Member of the European Parliament for East of England, defected from the UK Independence Party (UKIP) to join the SDP in November 2018. He cited UKIP leader Gerard Batten's appointment of Tommy Robinson as an adviser as a key reason for his departure from the party. In April 2019, O'Flynn stated that the SDP would not be standing in the 2019 European Parliament election.

In March 2019, prominent political journalists Rod Liddle and Giles Fraser announced that they had joined the party.

The SDP won a non-parish council seat at election for the first time since 2003 when Wayne Dixon was elected in the 2022 Leeds City Council election. Dixon was elected to Leeds City Council for Middleton Park and has a majority of 14% The party gained a second council seat later that year in October 2022, when Richard Bright, a Conservative Party councillor for Derbyshire Dales District Council, defected to the party.

On 22 October 2022, the Social Democratic Party announced a general election pact with the right-wing Reform UK for the next United Kingdom general election.

Policies
The SDP is a syncretic political party which combines centre-left economics with centre-right stances on social and cultural values. The party formally declared its principles in its "New Declaration" of October 2018.

Europe
The SDP's orientation is Eurosceptic. While the founders of the original SDP in 1981 were pro-EEC, the continuing SDP voted against the concept of a United States of Europe at its conference at Scarborough in 1989 and the 1990 party's Eurosceptic position developed from there. In March 2019, the party advocated the UK leaving the European Union on WTO terms in the absence of a better deal on offer. As of November 2019 the party supports the latest iteration of the withdrawal agreement.

Economy and welfare
The SDP's stance on the economy is centre-left, advocating a social market economy. It balances a commitment to enterprise and the market with support for greater progressivity in the tax code, substantial increases in the council housing stock, protection of legal aid, changes to the roll out of Universal Credit and renationalising utilities and the railways.

On housing, the SDP wants to build 100,000 social homes per year under a "British Housing Corporation", with subsidiary "County Housing Corporations". These "CHCs" would have substantial powers, being able to issue Compulsory Purchase Orders and having the ability to grant themselves planning permission. They would also take on all existing social housing from their respective local authorities.

The party would also introduce "a moratorium on buy-to-let mortgages" in order to re-balance the housing market in favour of young first-time buyers. To combat negligence in the rented sector, the SDP would introduce a "Conditions Certificate", likened to a "housing MOT", without which rent collection on the uncertified property would be illegal.

Foreign affairs and defence
The SDP supports marginal reductions in aid spending, in its view made possible by more effective use of the aid budget. It proposes that the Department for International Development be absorbed into a new Department of Foreign Affairs and Trade which would ensure a greater alignment of aid and UK foreign policy interests. The SDP has criticised past UK efforts to "impose liberal democracy on complex societies in the Middle East".

The SDP supports NATO and maintaining a minimum of 2% of GDP on defence. It would maintain and update Britain's nuclear deterrent and increase the size of the UK armed forces. It would complete the aircraft carrier programme and related air and naval investment to make and keep HMS Queen Elizabeth and HMS Prince of Wales fully operational. It supports increased spending on Intelligence to combat terrorism and cyber-warfare as a proportion of the overall defence budget. For veterans, it would increase their housing priority and create tax incentives for business to employ veterans.

Social issues and immigration
The SDP believes the tax and benefits system should offer "greater protection and support for family life". Couples raising children together (comprising a basic rate tax payer and a non tax payer) would benefit from full sharing of tax allowances under the party's proposals. Moreover, government policy in all domains would be subject to a basic test as to "whether it is supportive of the family as the fundamental foundation of society".

The party has a strong stance on reducing immigration, stating that "A return to moderate, controlled migration for a sustained period [...] would be beneficial. It would result in a less divided, more socially harmonious and more prosperous Britain." In a short documentary, party leader William Coulston says "Put simply, billions of people would probably qualify for asylum in the UK if you could get them here. This is not sustainable".

The party advocates a points-based immigration system which is "skills-based, needs-based, legal and subject to democratic control" and wants to contain net immigration to fewer than 50,000 per year. They outline a zero-tolerance policy for illegal immigration, with asylum seekers who use illegal routes being repatriated immediately, or detained offshore for later repatriation. On "genuine refugees", their policy is to allow 20,000 visas per year for "carefully vetted families with children in UN refugee camps or near major conflict zones".

Transgender rights 
The SDP's policy on transgender rights allows for a person to change their legal sex, subject to "medical gatekeeping". They oppose changes of legal sex by self-identification alone. The party supports "biological sex"-based segregation in sport, women's refuges and prisons.

The SDP supports healthcare spending for treatment of gender dysphoria, in both psychological and physiological forms, but stipulates that no physical treatments, including hormones, should be allowed for under-18s.

The party supports "gender-critical" viewpoints, having offered their support for Kathleen Stock, and stating "Woman = adult human female".

Leaders
 Jack Holmes (1990–1991) 
 John Bates (1991–2008)
 Peter Johnson (2008–2018)
 William Clouston (2018–present)

Electoral performance

Westminster general elections

Scottish Parliament elections

London Assembly elections

References

External links
 
 SDP Constitution and Party Rulebook (PDF)

Centrist political parties in the United Kingdom
Conservative parties in the United Kingdom
Eurosceptic parties in the United Kingdom
Political parties established in 1990
Social democratic parties in the United Kingdom
Social conservative parties
Social Democratic Party (UK)
Social Democratic Party (UK, 1990–present) MEPs
1990 establishments in the United Kingdom
Organisations that oppose transgender rights in the United Kingdom